Toumeyella is a genus of tortoise scales in the subfamily Myzolecaniinae of the true bug family Coccidae.

Species
Species recognized as of August 2021:

Toumeyella cerifera Ferris, 1921
Toumeyella coffeae Kondo, 2013
Toumeyella crataegi Kondo & González, 2018
Toumeyella cubensis Heidel & Köhler, 1979
Toumeyella erythrinae Kondo & Williams, 2003
Toumeyella fontanai Kondo & Pellizzari, 2011
Toumeyella lignumvitae Williams, 1993
Toumeyella liriodendri (Gmelin, 1790)
Toumeyella lomagundiae Hall, 1935
Toumeyella martinezi Kondo & González, 2014
Toumeyella mirabilis (Cockerell, 1895)
Toumeyella nectandrae Hempel, 1929
Toumeyella obunca De Lotto, 1966
Toumeyella parvicornis (Cockerell, 1897)
Toumeyella paulista Hempel, 1932
Toumeyella pini (King, 1901)
Toumeyella pinicola Ferris, 1920
Toumeyella quadrifasciata (Cockerell, 1895)
Toumeyella sonorensis (Cockerell & Parrott, 1899)
Toumeyella turgida (Cockerell, 1897)
Toumeyella virginiana Williams & Kosztarab, 1972

References

Coccidae
Sternorrhyncha genera